The 2017 Norwegian Figure Skating Championships was held at the CC Amfi in Hamar from 13 to 15 January 2017. The skaters participating must have reached a minimum technical element score (TES) set by the Norwegian Skating Association at one of the national qualification events during the 2016–17 season.

References

External links
 2017 Norwegian Championships results
 Official website

Norwegian Figure Skating Championships
Norwegian Figure Skating Championships, 2017
2017 in Norwegian sport